Sárköz (Hungarian: "mud alley" or "mud passage") may refer to:

Sárköz, a historical area in Tolna (county), Hungary
Livada, Satu Mare, a town in Satu Mare County, Romania

See also
Sárközi